Lee Konitz Plays (aka Jazz Time Paris: Vol. VII) is an album by saxophonist and bandleader Lee Konitz featuring performances recorded in Paris in 1953 which were originally released as a 10 inch LP on the French Disques Vogue label.

Reception

The Allmusic review by Scott Yanow stated "The cool-toned altoist is in fine form for his set".

Track listing
All compositions by Lee Konitz except where noted
 "I'll Remember April" (Gene de Paul, Patricia Johnston, Don Raye) – 4:12
 "Record Shop Suey" – 3:14
 "Le Tchee" – 2:34
 "Young Lee" – 3:18
 "You'd Be So Nice to Come Home To" (Cole Porter) – 2:35
 "4PM" – 2:40
 "Lost Henri" – 3:22

Personnel
Lee Konitz – alto saxophone
Henri Renaud – piano
Jimmy Gourley – guitar
Don Bagley – bass
Stan Levey – drums

References

Lee Konitz albums
1953 albums
Disques Vogue albums